Ashlar is finely dressed (cut, worked) stone, either an individual stone that has been worked until squared, or a structure built from such stones. Ashlar is the finest stone masonry unit, generally rectangular cuboid, mentioned by Vitruvius as opus isodomum, or less frequently trapezoidal. Precisely cut "on all faces adjacent to those of other stones", ashlar is capable of very thin joints between blocks, and the visible face of the stone may be quarry-faced or feature a variety of treatments: tooled, smoothly polished or rendered with another material for decorative effect.

One such decorative treatment consists of small grooves achieved by the application of a metal comb. Generally used only on softer stone ashlar, this decoration is known as "mason's drag".
 
Ashlar is in contrast to rubble masonry, which employs irregularly shaped stones, sometimes minimally worked or selected for similar size, or both. Ashlar is related but distinct from other stone masonry that is finely dressed but not quadrilateral, such as curvilinear and polygonal masonry.

Ashlar may be  coursed, which involves lengthy horizontal layers of stone blocks laid in parallel, and therefore with continuous horizontal joints. Ashlar may also be random, which involves stone blocks laid with deliberately discontinuous courses and therefore discontinuous joints both vertically and horizontally. In either case, it generally uses a joining material such as mortar to bind the blocks together, although dry ashlar construction, metal ties, and other methods of assembly have been used. The dry ashlar of Inca architecture in Cusco and Machu Picchu is particularly fine and famous.

Etymology
The word is attested in Middle English and derives from the Old French aisselier, from the Latin axilla, a diminutive of axis, meaning "plank". "Clene hewen ashler" often occurs in medieval documents; this means tooled or finely worked, in contradistinction to rough-axed faces.

Use
Ashlar blocks have been used in the construction of many buildings as an alternative to brick or other materials.

In classical architecture, ashlar wall surfaces were often contrasted with rustication.

The term is frequently used to describe the dressed stone work of prehistoric Greece and Crete, although the dressed blocks are usually much larger than modern ashlar. For example, the tholos tombs of Bronze Age Mycenae use ashlar masonry in the construction of the so-called "beehive" dome. This dome consists of finely cut ashlar blocks that decrease in size and terminate in a central capstone. These domes are not true domes, but are constructed using the corbel arch.

Ashlar masonry was also heavily used in the construction of palace facades on Crete, including Knossos and Phaistos. These constructions date to the MM III-LM Ib period, c. 1700–1450 BC.

As metaphor
In some Masonic groupings, which such societies term jurisdictions, ashlars are used as a symbolic metaphor for how one's personal development relates to the tenets of their lodge. As described in the explanation of the First Degree Tracing Board, in Emulation and other Masonic rituals the rough ashlar is a stone as taken directly from the quarry, and allegorically represents the Freemason prior to his initiation; a smooth ashlar (or "perfect ashlar") is a stone that has been smoothed and dressed by the experienced stonemason, and allegorically represents the Freemason who, through education and diligence, has learned the lessons of Freemasonry and who lives an upstanding life.

See also
Ablaq
Dimension stone
Opus quadratum
Stone cladding
Stone veneer

References

External links

Building stone
Stonemasonry
Types of wall
Wallcoverings
Architectural elements
Garden features
Masonic symbolism